WOSB may refer to: 

 War Office Selection Boards, used by the British Army during World War II
 Woman Owned Small Business, classification by the Small Business Administration
 WOSB (FM), a radio station (91.1 FM) licensed to serve Marion, Ohio, United States